Usmanovo (Uśman) is a rural locality (a village) in Tashtamaksky Selsoviet, Aurgazinsky District, Bashkortostan, Russia. The population was 165 as of 2010.

Geography 
It is located 15 km from Tolbazy and 4 km from Tashtamak.

References 

Rural localities in Aurgazinsky District